Lionel Tertis, CBE (29 December 187622 February 1975) was an English violist. He was one of the first viola players to achieve international fame and a noted teacher.

Career
Tertis was born in West Hartlepool, the son of Polish-Jewish immigrants. He first studied violin in Leipzig, Germany and at the Royal Academy of Music (RAM) in London. There he was encouraged by the principal, Alexander Mackenzie, to take up the viola instead.   Under the additional influence of Oskar Nedbal, he did so and rapidly became one of the best known violists of his time, touring Europe and the US as a soloist.

As Professor of Viola at the RAM (from 1900), he encouraged his colleagues and students to compose for the instrument, thereby greatly expanding its repertoire. In 1906, Tertis was temporarily in the famous Bohemian Quartet to replace the violist/composer Oskar Nedbal and later he took the viola position in the Gerald Walenn Quartet.

Composers such as Arnold Bax, Frank Bridge, Gustav Holst, Benjamin Dale, York Bowen, Ralph Vaughan Williams, Arthur Bliss, and William Walton wrote pieces for him. The Walton piece was his Viola Concerto; however, Tertis did not give the world premiere as he found it difficult to comprehend at the time; that honour went to Paul Hindemith. His pupil Bernard Shore took on the second performance at the Proms in August 1930. Tertis first performed the work a month later at the International Society for Contemporary Music festival in Liège. Over the next three years he gave five more performances of the concerto.

He owned a 1717 Montagnana from 1920 to 1937 which he found during one of his concert tours to Paris in 1920, and took a chance in acquiring. According to his memoirs, it was "shown to me in an unplayable condition, without bridge, strings or fingerboard.... No case was available – it was such a large instrument 17 1/8 inches – so my wife came to the rescue by wrapping it in her waterproof coat, and that is how it was taken across the English Channel." Tertis preferred a large viola to get an especially rich tone from his instrument. Knowing that some would find a 17-1/8-inch instrument too large he created his own Tertis model, which provides many of the tonal advantages of the larger instrument in a manageable 16-3/4-inch size. Tertis sold the 1717 Montegnana to his pupil Bernard Shore in 1937, who in turn passed it on to his pupil Roger Chase. 

Along with William Murdoch (piano), Albert Sammons, and Lauri Kennedy, Tertis formed the Chamber Music Players. He also encouraged and coached Sidney Griller as he worked to found the Griller Quartet in 1928, and influenced the Griller's enthusiasm for the first Viennese School. 

In 1937, while at the height of his powers, he announced his retirement from the concert platform to concentrate on teaching.  He appeared as soloist only one more time, at a special concert in 1949 to an invited audience at the RAM to help raise money for his fund to encourage the composition of music for the viola.

He was appointed a Commander of the Order of the British Empire (CBE) in the 1950 New Year's Honours.

Tertis composed several original works and also arranged many pieces not originally for the viola, such as Edward Elgar's Cello Concerto. He was the author of a number of publications about string playing, the viola in particular, and his own life. They include Cinderella No More and My Viola and I.

Lionel Tertis died on 22 February 1975 in Wimbledon, London. He was 98 years old.

Legacy

 
The Lionel Tertis International Viola Competition was established in 1980 to honour his memory.

In February 2007 Roger Chase, along with his accompanist, pianist Michiko Otaki), initiated "The Tertis Project," a series of concerts devoted to works composed for Tertis. A CD, The Tertis Tradition, was issued in 2009.

In 2015, English Heritage unveiled a blue plaque at his Wimbledon, London home.

Many fine English violists were students of Tertis, including Harry Berly, Rebecca Clarke, Eric Coates, Winifred Copperwheat, Paul Cropper, Harry Danks, C. Sidney Errington, Watson Forbes, Max Gilbert, Hope Hambourg, Raymond Jeremy, James Lockyer, Frederick Riddle, Ian Ritchie, Philip Sainton, Beryl Scawen Blunt, Bernard Shore, Gilbert Shufflebotham, Jacqueline Townshend, Maurice Ward and Lena Wood.

Works

Original compositions 

 Elizabethan Melody for viola and cello
 15th Century Folk Song: 1452-Anonymous for viola, cello and piano  
 Hier au soir for viola and piano
 Rêverie for viola and piano
 Sunset (Coucher du soleil) for viola (or violin or cello) and piano
 Three Sketches for viola and piano
     Serenade; revised as A Tune
     The Blackbirds (1952)
     The River
 A Tune for viola and piano (published 1954); 2nd version of Serenade
 Variations on a Passacaglia of Handel for 2 violas (1935); original work based on the Passacaglia by Johan Halvorsen
 Variations on a Four Bar Theme of Handel for viola and cello

Transcriptions, arrangements and adaptations 

For viola and piano unless otherwise noted

Recordings 
Lionel Tertis made recordings in ensembles:

 Vocalion D-02019 Robert Fuchs: Duet; Handel (arr. Halvorsen): Passacaglia with Albert Sammons
 Columbia LX225-7 Brahms: Sonata in F minor, Op.120/1, with Harriet Cohen, piano
 Columbia L 2342-3 Delius (arr. Tertis): (Violin) sonata 2 (1915) 3s / Hassan - Serenade, with G. Reeves, piano
	
and as a soloist:

 HMV Treasury HLM 7055, Sonatas by Brahms, Handel, Delius, music by Bach, Mendelssohn etc. Recorded between 1920 & 1933. issued:74

Writings

References

External links
 Erin Arts Centre: Lionel Tertis photo gallery
 Harold B. Lee Library: Tertis discography

Other reading
John White, Lionel Tertis: The First Great Virtuoso of the Viola (Woodbridge: Boydell Press, 2006)
Tully Potter, "Chase Fulfilled", The Strad, August 1988.

1876 births
1975 deaths
People from West Hartlepool
Alumni of the Royal Academy of Music
English classical violists
English Jews
Royal Philharmonic Society Gold Medallists
English composers
Commanders of the Order of the British Empire